Larry Joseph Melnyk (born February 21, 1960) is a Canadian former professional ice hockey player. He played in the National Hockey League for the Boston Bruins, Edmonton Oilers, New York Rangers, and Vancouver Canucks in a career that lasted from 1980 to 1990. With the Oilers he won the Stanley Cup in 1984 and 1985. Prior to turning professional Melnyk played major junior for the New Westminster Bruins of the Western Hockey League, winning the 1978 Memorial Cup with them. He was selected by Boston in the 1979 NHL Entry Draft. Internationally Melnyk played for Canada at the 1979 World Junior Championship.

Playing career
He was born in Saskatoon, Saskatchewan, Melnyk started his National Hockey League career with the Boston Bruins in 1980. He also played for the Edmonton Oilers, New York Rangers, and Vancouver Canucks. He left the NHL after the 1990 season.

Melnyk won two Stanley Cup rings with Edmonton, in 1984 and 1985. In 1984, he spent the whole regular season in the minors. He was called up and played six playoff games. His name was not engraved on the Cup, because he had not played enough games to qualify.  Melnyk joined Edmonton full-time midway through the 1985 season.  He played in the Final and got his name was engraved on the Cup that season.

Career statistics

Regular season and playoffs

International

Awards

NHL

WHL and CHL

External links
 

1960 births
Living people
Baltimore Skipjacks players
Binghamton Dusters players
Boston Bruins draft picks
Boston Bruins players
Canadian ice hockey defencemen
Canadian people of Ukrainian descent
Edmonton Oilers players
Erie Blades players
Hershey Bears players
Ice hockey people from British Columbia
Moncton Alpines (AHL) players
New Westminster Bruins players
New York Rangers players
Nova Scotia Oilers players
Sportspeople from New Westminster
Springfield Indians players
Vancouver Canucks players